Timothé Cognat (born 25 January 1998) is a French professional footballer who plays as a midfielder for the Swiss club Servette.

Career
On 30 June 2019, Cognat permanently signed with Servette FC after a season on loan from Olympique Lyonnais.

Honours
France U17
 UEFA European Under-17 Championship: 2015

Individual
 UEFA European Under-17 Championship: 2015 Team of the Tournament

References

External links
 
 FFF Profile

1998 births
Living people
French footballers
Association football midfielders
France youth international footballers
Servette FC players
Olympique Lyonnais players
Swiss Super League players
Swiss Challenge League players
French expatriate footballers
French expatriate sportspeople in Switzerland
Expatriate footballers in Switzerland
Sportspeople from Rhône (department)
Footballers from Auvergne-Rhône-Alpes